Giampiero Catone (born 1 June 1956 in Naples, Campania) is an Italian politician and journalist.

Biography
Giampiero Catone was born on 1 June 1956 in Naples. He graduated in Political Sciences at the D'Annunzio University of Chieti–Pescara.

In 2005 he became responsible director for the political newspaper La Discussione. In the 2006 general election Catone was elected in the Chamber of Deputies into the Forza Italia list and he joined the DCA-NPSI group.

In the 2008 general election Catone was again elected in the Chamber of Deputies with The People of Freedom.
On 23 September 2010, he left the PDL's group to join Future and Freedom. On 14 December 2010 he decided to vote the trust to the Berlusconi Cabinet and he announced the abandonment of FLI, to switch to the mixed group.

On 20 January 2011 he joined the Responsible Initiative group and on 5 May he was appointed Undersecretary to the Ministry for the Environment, Land and Sea of the Berlusconi Cabinet.

In March 2012 Catone joined with his clubs "La Discussione" to the new Christian Democracy led by Gianni Fontana, while in November he founded Popular Agreement.

In the 2013 general election Catone was candidated with Popular Agreement into the centre-right coalition, but he was not re-elected.

Court proceedings
On 9 May 2001, Catone was arrested together with his brother Massimo and other twelve people on charges of conspiracy to aggravated fraud, forgery, false corporate communications and aggravated fraudulent bankruptcy. Catone was charged for two fraudulent bankruptcies by ₤25 billion each and the improper obtaining of ₤12 billion of non-repayable funding through the presentation of false documentation. On 23 February 2012 he was sentenced in first instance to eight years imprisonment for this event.

In 2003, he was indicted for the failure of Abatec, an industry that manufactured diaper machines. The allegations put to him riguardarono various tax crimes, including false accounting and fraudulent bankruptcy. Cato was acquitted for 9 of the 12 counts, while the remaining 3 were declared prescribed.

References

External links
 Giampiero Catone's blog

1956 births
Living people
Italian journalists
Politicians from Naples
Christian Democratic Centre politicians
Union of the Centre (2002) politicians
Christian Democracy for the Autonomies politicians
The People of Freedom politicians
Future and Freedom politicians
Christian Revolution politicians
Deputies of Legislature XV of Italy
Deputies of Legislature XVI of Italy
D'Annunzio University of Chieti–Pescara alumni